Castle Hill Ward is a ward in the North West Area of Ipswich, Suffolk, England. It returns three councillors to Ipswich Borough Council and it's designated Middle Layer Super Output Area Ipswich 002 by the Office of National Statistics. It is composed of 5 Lower Layer Super Output Areas.

Robin Vickery, one of the Conservative Borough Councillors resigned on 8 June 2020 following over 20 complaints made concerning racist posts he had shared on Facebook. He resigned before a Council investigation could be put in place, also resigning as Suffolk County councillor for Carlford Division, Suffolk and from the Conservative Party. Ipswich Borough Council stated that in light of the COVID-19 pandemic, the seat would not be contested until May 2021.

Ward profile, 2008
Castle Hill Ward is located to the north of central Ipswich. In 2005 it had a population of about 7,500. It has the lowest proportion of its residents living alone in Ipswich and has more than average older residents.

Councillors
The following councillors were elected since the boundaries were changed in 2002. Names in brackets indicates that the councillor remained in office without re-election.

References

Wards of Ipswich